The 1971 Ballon d'Or, given to the best football player in Europe as judged by a panel of sports journalists from UEFA member countries, was awarded to Johan Cruyff on 28 December 1971.

Cruyff was the first Dutch national to win the award, and also the first Ajax player to win the trophy.

Rankings

Notes

References

External links
 France Football Official Ballon d'Or page

1971
1971–72 in European football